Douglas is an unincorporated community in Putnam County, in the U.S. state of Ohio.

History
A post office called Douglas was established in 1880, and remained in operation until 1907. The town site was not officially platted.

References

Unincorporated communities in Putnam County, Ohio
Unincorporated communities in Ohio